Chrysotoxum derivatum is a species of North American hoverfly.

Description
8.9–16.2mm in length.

Distribution
Southern Alaska, Canada, United States & Mexico.

References

Insects described in 1849
Diptera of North America
Syrphinae